Kathy Gordon (born 18 July 1967) is a Canadian speed skater. She competed in the women's 5000 metres at the 1988 Winter Olympics.

References

External links
 

1967 births
Living people
Canadian female speed skaters
Olympic speed skaters of Canada
Speed skaters at the 1988 Winter Olympics
Sportspeople from Nanaimo
20th-century Canadian women